The 9th Battalion (Parachute), Royal Malay Regiment, abbreviated 9 RAMD (Para) from its local name, is a battalion-sized airborne infantry unit of the Malaysian Army's Royal Malay Regiment. Since 10 October 1994, 9 RAMD has been a part of the 10th Parachute Brigade.

The current commander of the 9 RAMD (Para) is Lieutenant Colonel Norazlan Abu.

History

Formed as an infantry unit 
On 1 September 1965, during the Indonesia–Malaysia conflict, a pioneer team was formed in Majidee Camp, Johor Bahru. Lieutenant Colonel Mahmood Sulaiman was appointed as its first commander and was tasked with growing the unit to combat size. The unit's strength was increased on 31 December 1965, and two new companies were formed: Battalion HQ Company and A Company. On 5 March 1966, 120 new soldiers were transferred to 9 RAMD, resulting in the formation of B and C Companies. Later, D Company was added, and the infantry battalion was officially established.

The 9 RAMD was the first infantry battalion from Malaysia's post-independence army to be invited to participate in a military exercise overseas. In 1974, the unit travelled to Australia to participate in Exercise Latin Forum. Four years prior, 9 RAMD was also the first infantry battalion to participate in a Commonwealth Nations military exercise called Exercise Bersatu Padu.

The 9 RAMD was actively involved in the Communist insurgency in Malaysia (1968–1989), particularly in Sarawak. Between 1972 and 1974, the 9 RAMD was involved in numerous skirmishes and managed to kill 38 communist terrorists and apprehend 16, an extraordinary feat for a non-special forces unit. Because of their achievements in Sarawak, the King of Malaysia had the honour of presenting the battalion with its colours on 22 March 1975.

Reconstruct for an airborne role 
In the early 1990s, as part of the TD 2000 plan, 9 RAMD and 17th Battalion, Royal Malay Regiment (17 RAMD) were designated to be upgraded to an airborne unit. A few of its members were sent to Special Warfare Training Centre in Malacca to receive airborne training. In early December 1992, 9 RAMD was transferred from Quetter Camp in Kluang to Terendak Camp in Malacca and assigned to the Malaysian Army's 11th Strategic Division's 10th Strategic Brigade. On 13 December 1992, under the bill KP/TD/P&P/4019/3, the 9th RAMD was officially renamed the 9th Battalion (Parachute), Royal Malay Regiment, and given one year to fully train to achieve operational status as an airborne unit. By 1 January 1995, 70% of the 9 RAMD had received parachute training.

Reassemble as the Rapid Deployment Force 

The Malaysian Army's top brass intends to combine all airborne units into a single combat force. The 8th Battalion (Parachute), Royal Ranger Regiment, 9 RAMD (Para), and 17 RAMD (Para) were merged into a single airborne unit in 1993 as its airborne infantry element. On 10 October 1994, following Exercise Halilintar, then-prime minister Dr Mahathir Mohamad officially introduced the unit as the Rapid Deployment Force, and the 10th Strategic Brigade was renamed the 10th Parachute Brigade. The 10th Parachute Brigade is becoming an independent combat force reporting directly to the Chief of the Army.

Role and responsibilities 
The 9 RAMD (Para) serves as an airborne infantry unit for the Rapid Deployment Force (RDF). The RDF's airborne infantry is tasked with being able to deploy at any time and to any location via air, land, or sea. They have five primary roles, which are as follows:

 Operate conventionally, either independently or as part of a joint force, in response to threats that occur within or outside of Malaysia.
 Defending and rescuing Malaysian citizens and property located abroad.
 Assisting law enforcement with any threats that occur within Malaysia.
 Fight the insurgency.
 Assisting friendly countries in the event of a natural disaster, defending their citizens, or serving as a peacekeeper.

Formations

Current formation 
Since December 1992, the 9 RAMD (Para) has been stationed at Terendak Camp in Malacca. Under 9 RAMD, there are six paratrooper companies and one welfare organisation.

Disbanded units

Tiger Platoon, 9 RAMD 
The Tiger Platoon was a commando unit of the 9 Royal Malay Regiment. In 1972, the platoon was established as a long-range reconnaissance patrol for 9 RAMD, and its status was later upgraded to a commando unit at the end of 1972. Tiger Platoon 9 RAMD was active during the Communist insurgency in Malaysia (1968–1989), particularly in Sarawak, and this platoon was responsible for the majority of terrorists killed by 9 RAMD. Two members of this platoon received Malaysia's second highest valour award, the Star of the Commander of Valour.

This platoon's 31 members are as follows:

 Captain (Quartermaster) Shamsudin Ghows (400788)
 Captain Mohd Yasin Hj Tahir (410032)
 Second Lieutenant Zainal Seman (411031)
 Second Lieutenant Ibrahim Hj Sudin (410778)
 8165 Warrant Officer Class II Jantan Nyamat, 
 10597 Sergeant Mohd Yusof Mohd Yunus
 11590 Corporal Abd Wahab Abd Latif
 16767 Corporal  Zainal Abidin Panjang Salleh
 10157 Corporal  Hadi Ghazali
 17300 Corporal Kamaruddin Atan
 9592 Corporal Safar Ibrahim, 
 11585 Corporal Othman Leman
 928844 Corporal Ibrahim Wan Chik
 928824 Lance Corporal Abu Bakar Ahmad
 17816 Lance Corporal Mohd Yusof Nazir
 16896 Private Mohamad Abu Bakar
 17591 Private Dalip Juri
 928782 Private Ibrahim Harun
 19085 Private Abd Rahman Mohamad
 930827 Private Sharif Harun
 23493 Private Mohd Ali Abd Rahman
 26068 Private Minhad Abd Rahman
 23291 Private Mohamad Abd Rahman
 19297 Private Wan Yaakob Wan Ibrahim
 23326 Private Othman Sulaiman
 19866 Private Halim Sulaiman
 19072 Private Johan Baba
 25602 Private Azamat Sudin
 28616 Private Mohamad Sulung
 19961 Private Abd Rasap Siang
 19301 Private Che Daud Che Soh

Traditions and customs

Colours 

 Green – Comradery and trust are represented by this colour.
 Black – Represents sheer tenacity and courage.

Uniforms 
Maroon beret

The maroon beret represented the battalion's ability as an airborne unit. The British Army's Parachute Regiment had a strong influence on the Malaysian Army's airborne force establishment. Since 10 October 1994, all RDF-trained members have worn this beret.

Ceremonial object 
Sculpture of a silver horse warrior

The horse warrior, made of pure silver, was presented to the battalion by General Tan Sri Yaacob Mohd Zain, the 10th Chief of Defence Forces, in 1993. General Tan Sri Yaacob was the 9 RAMD's third Commander. The sculpture, which cost RM 46,000, was made in Kuala Lumpur. Its foundation is made of teak. It represents the strength and agility of the 9 RAMD.

List of commanders

Notable members 

 Hayazi Abdul Aziz - Warrant Officer Class I Hayazi Abdul Aziz is the current Malaysian Armed Forces (MAF) Regimental Sergeant Major, the highest position for other ranks in the MAF. His first unit after completing boot camp was 9 RAMD (Para), where he held various positions, such as company sergeant major and parachute instructor warrant officer. He then held various positions in the army, including the highest rank of Regimental Sergeant Major of the Malaysian Army on 7 May 2015. He was promoted to Regimental sergeant major of the MAF on 6 October 2019.
 Jantan Nyamat,  - Jantan joined the army in 1952 and left in 1959. He reenlisted and returned to his old unit, 1 RAMD, on 15 November 1963, during the Indonesia–Malaysia conflict. He was transferred here after 9 RAMD was established in 1965, and he then volunteered for the newly formed Tiger Platoon of 9 RAMD. He was promoted to the rank of Platoon Sergeant. He accomplished much with the Tiger Platoon, and the King of Malaysia awarded him the Star of the Commander of Valour for his actions on 23 December 1972. Jantan retired from the army with the rank of Warrant Officer Class II in 1979.
 Safar Ibrahim,  - Safar enlisted in the army in 1953. In Tiger Platoon, he was a section leader. During a routine patrol on 20 December 1972, his team of four was ambushed by a team of communist terrorists. The strength of the opposing team ranges between 20 and 25 members. Despite being outnumbered and all of the patrol members having been shot, they managed to kill one terrorist and survive the ambush. Safar bravely exposed himself 20 minutes after the ambush began in order to find a location to call for backup because his patrol was already low on ammo. He threw two grenades as cover fire and managed to call for backup. The King of Malaysia awarded him the Star of the Commander of Valour for his bravery during the ambush. On 22 January 1977, Safar retired from the army with the rank of Corporal. He died in a car accident in 1980.
Taib Tawal Pingat Gagah Berani - Taib enlisted in the army in late 1960's he involved battle of Gunung Pueh in November 1973 with his leader Captain Hamid Awang
 Yaacob Mohd Zain - General (Retd.) Tan Sri Yaacob Mohd Zain was the third Commander of 9 RAMD. He was promoted to the highest professional rank in the Malaysian Armed Forces, Chief of the Defence Forces, on 11 April 1992.
Zulkifeli Mohd Zin - General (Retd.) Tan Sri Zulkifeli Mohd Zin was the 15th Commander of 9 RAMD (Para). He is the unit's first commander since it was rebuilt for an airborne role. On 15 June 2011, he was appointed the 18th Chief of the Defence Forces.

References 

Malaysian Army